Palm Valley may mean:

Palm Valley, Florida, United States
Palm Valley, Cameron County, Texas, United States
Palm Valley, Williamson County, Texas United States
Palm Valley (Northern Territory), Australia
Palm Valley, Baja California, Mexico
Palm Valley, Hyderabad, India